Ravil Syagidovich Netfullin (born 3 March 1993) is a Russian professional football player of Tatar descent. He plays for FC Torpedo Moscow.

Club career
He made his debut in the Russian Premier League on 28 July 2012 for CSKA Moscow in a game against Amkar Perm.

He played in the 2017–18 Russian Cup final for FC Avangard Kursk on 9 May 2018 in the Volgograd Arena against 2–1 winners FC Tosno.

Honours
CSKA Moscow
Russian Premier League (1): 2012–13

Torpedo Moscow
 Russian Football National League : 2021-22

Career statistics

References

External links
 
 Profile by Football National League

1993 births
Footballers from Moscow
Tatar people of Russia
Tatar sportspeople
Living people
Russian footballers
Russia youth international footballers
Russia under-21 international footballers
Association football midfielders
PFC CSKA Moscow players
FC Fakel Voronezh players
FC Solyaris Moscow players
FC Shinnik Yaroslavl players
FC Avangard Kursk players
FC Khimki players
FC Torpedo Moscow players
Russian Premier League players
Russian Second League players
Russian First League players